Nona Garson (born 30 September 1958) is an American equestrian. She was born in Westfield, New Jersey. She competed in team jumping and individual jumping at the 2000 Summer Olympics in Sydney.

References

External links
 

1958 births
Living people
People from Westfield, New Jersey
Sportspeople from New Jersey
American female equestrians
Olympic equestrians of the United States
Equestrians at the 2000 Summer Olympics
21st-century American women
Equestrians at the 1995 Pan American Games
Pan American Games bronze medalists for the United States
Medalists at the 1995 Pan American Games
Pan American Games medalists in equestrian